The 1995 Formula One Indoor Trophy took place on December 7–8 at the Bologna Motor Show. The winner was Luca Badoer in a Minardi-Ford.

Participants

Results

Preliminary rounds

Knockout stage

References

 Bologna Sprint - The GEL Motorsport Information Page

Formula One Indoor Trophy
Formula One Indoor Trophy
Formula One Indoor Trophy